Paul Bronner (18 May 1913 – 18 November 1976) was a French sprinter. He competed in the men's 100 metres at the 1936 Summer Olympics.

References

1913 births
1976 deaths
Athletes (track and field) at the 1936 Summer Olympics
French male sprinters
Olympic athletes of France
Place of birth missing